Microbisium is a genus of pseudoscorpions in the family Neobisiidae. There are about 12 described species in Microbisium.

Species
These 12 species belong to the genus Microbisium:

 Microbisium brevifemoratum (Ellingsen, 1903) i c g
 Microbisium brevipalpe (Redikorzev, 1922) i c g
 Microbisium brunneum (Hagen, 1868) i c g b
 Microbisium congicum Beier, 1955 i c g
 Microbisium dogieli (Redikorzev, 1924) i c g
 Microbisium fagetum Cîrdei, Bulimar and Malcoci, 1967 i c g
 Microbisium lawrencei Beier, 1964 i c g
 Microbisium manicatum (L. Koch, 1873) i c g
 Microbisium parvulum (Banks, 1895) i c g b
 Microbisium pygmaeum (Ellingsen, 1907) i c g
 Microbisium suecicum Lohmander, 1945 i c g
 Microbisium zariquieyi (Navás, 1919) i c g

Data sources: i = ITIS, c = Catalogue of Life, g = GBIF, b = Bugguide.net

References

Further reading

External links

 
 

Neobisiidae